The Russian National Youth Symphony Orchestra (RNYSO) (PHMCO) is the national youth orchestra of Russia, based in Moscow. It was established in 2018 with the support of the Foundation of Presidential Grants and the Ministry of Culture and consists of 108 instrumentalists from throughout Russia.

The orchestra has been conducted by Valery Gergiev, Vladimir Fedoseyev, Michail Jurowski, Alexander Lazarev, Alexander Sladkovsky, Jean-Christophe Spinosi, Yuri Simonov, Antonello Manacorda, Alexander Anisimov, Nayden Todorov and Maxim Emelyanychev. Soloists that have appeared with the ensemble include Denis Matsuev, Julian Rachlin, Pavel Milyukov, Dmitry Masleev, Sergei Dogadin, Anastasia Kobekina, Alexandre Kantorow, Konstantin Emelyanov, Mao Fujita, Kenneth Broberg, Boris Berezovsky, Barry Douglas, Nikolai Lugansky, Lars Vogt, Sergej Krylov, Alina Ibragimova, Maxim Rysanov and Julia Lezhneva.

See also 
 List of youth orchestras

References 

Music education organizations
Russian symphony orchestras
National youth orchestras
Musical groups established in 2018
2018 establishments in Russia